Jesal Karia (born 7 November 1989) is an Indian cricketer. He made his first-class debut for Gujarat in the 2011–12 Ranji Trophy on 10 November 2011.

References

External links
 

1989 births
Living people
Indian cricketers
Gujarat cricketers
People from Anand district